Ramiro Eduardo de León Ibarra (18 March 1938 – 11 August 2007) was an Uruguayan basketball player who competed in the 1964 Summer Olympics.

References

External links
 

1938 births
2007 deaths
Uruguayan men's basketball players
1963 FIBA World Championship players
1967 FIBA World Championship players
1970 FIBA World Championship players
Olympic basketball players of Uruguay
Basketball players at the 1963 Pan American Games
Basketball players at the 1964 Summer Olympics
Pan American Games competitors for Uruguay